Elizabeth "Beth" MacGregor (born 11 May 1993) is an English former cricketer who played as an all-rounder. She was a left-handed batter and left-arm medium bowler. She appeared in three Twenty20 Internationals for England, all against Sri Lanka in November 2010. She also appeared for England Academy between 2009 and 2012. She played county cricket for Essex between 2008 and 2013.

MacGregor replaced Anya Shrubsole in the England squad for the One Day International series against New Zealand in England in July 2010 having travelled with the Academy side to Bangalore in March. She was part of the England squad which toured Sri Lanka in 2010 and made her Twenty20 International debut on 19 November at Nondescripts Cricket Club Ground, Colombo.

She studied at Chigwell School.

References

External links
 
 

1993 births
Living people
People from Leytonstone
England women Twenty20 International cricketers
Essex women cricketers